The 1983 Pittsburgh Pirates season was the 102nd season of the Pittsburgh Pirates franchise; their 97th in the National League. This was their 14th season at Three Rivers Stadium. The Pirates finished second in the National League East with a record of 84–78.

Regular season

Season standings

Record vs. opponents

Game log

|- bgcolor="ccffcc"
| 1 || April 5 || @ Cardinals || 7–1 || Candelaria (1–0) || Forsch || — || 43,509 || 1–0
|- bgcolor="ccffcc"
| 2 || April 7 || @ Astros || 3–2 || Scurry (1–0) || Knepper || — || 7,741 || 2–0
|- bgcolor="ccffcc"
| 3 || April 8 || @ Astros || 5–3 || Scurry (2–0) || DiPino || Bibby (1) || 10,862 || 3–0
|- bgcolor="ccffcc"
| 4 || April 9 || @ Astros || 1–0 || McWilliams (1–0) || Niekro || — || 13,856 || 4–0
|- bgcolor="ccffcc"
| 5 || April 10 || @ Astros || 10–8 || Bibby (1–0) || Solano || Scurry (1) || 7,668 || 5–0
|- bgcolor="ffbbbb"
| 6 || April 12 || Cardinals || 3–4 (10) || Sutter || Bibby (1–1) || Rasmussen || 46,869 || 5–1
|- bgcolor="ffbbbb"
| 7 || April 13 || Cardinals || 1–9 || Andujar || Tunnell (0–1) || — || 4,126 || 5–2
|- bgcolor="ffbbbb"
| 8 || April 16 || Cubs || 5–6 || Hernandez || McWilliams (1–1) || Smith || 5,494 || 5–3
|- bgcolor="ccffcc"
| 9 || April 17 || Cubs || 7–0 || Candelaria (2–0) || Trout || Rhoden (1) || 14,285 || 6–3
|- bgcolor="ffbbbb"
| 10 || April 20 || @ Mets || 0–6 || Seaver || McWilliams (1–2) || — ||  || 6–4
|- bgcolor="ffbbbb"
| 11 || April 20 || @ Mets || 5–7 || Diaz || Tekulve (0–1) || Allen || 4,041 || 6–5
|- bgcolor="ffbbbb"
| 12 || April 22 || Dodgers || 2–4 || Reuss || Rhoden (0–1) || Pena || 8,846 || 6–6
|- bgcolor="ffbbbb"
| 13 || April 23 || Dodgers || 2–3 || Welch || Candelaria (2–1) || Howe || 8,187 || 6–7
|- bgcolor="ccffcc"
| 14 || April 26 || Giants || 3–0 || McWilliams (2–2) || Breining || — || 7,103 || 7–7
|- bgcolor="ffbbbb"
| 15 || April 27 || Giants || 2–3 || Laskey || Rhoden (0–2) || Minton || 5,267 || 7–8
|- bgcolor="ffbbbb"
| 16 || April 30 || Padres || 4–8 || Hawkins || Candelaria (2–2) || — ||  || 7–9
|- bgcolor="ccffcc"
| 17 || April 30 || Padres || 2–1 || McWilliams (3–2) || DeLeon || Scurry (2) || 19,593 || 8–9
|-

|- bgcolor="ccffcc"
| 18 || May 2 || @ Dodgers || 5–1 || Rhoden (1–2) || Reuss || — || 39,765 || 9–9
|- bgcolor="ffbbbb"
| 19 || May 3 || @ Dodgers || 4–5 || Pena || Bibby (1–2) || Howe || 34,624 || 9–10
|- bgcolor="ffbbbb"
| 20 || May 4 || @ Dodgers || 2–3 || Niedenfuer || Sarmiento (0–1) || — || 35,757 || 9–11
|- bgcolor="ffbbbb"
| 21 || May 6 || @ Giants || 1–2 || McGaffigan || Candelaria (2–3) || Lavelle || 16,476 || 9–12
|- bgcolor="ffbbbb"
| 22 || May 7 || @ Giants || 1–5 || Breining || Rhoden (1–3) || — || 10,874 || 9–13
|- bgcolor="ffbbbb"
| 23 || May 8 || @ Giants || 1–12 || Laskey || Bibby (1–3) || — || 19,123 || 9–14
|- bgcolor="ccffcc"
| 24 || May 9 || @ Padres || 5–3 (14) || Sarmiento (1–1) || Couchee || — || 17,885 || 10–14
|- bgcolor="ffbbbb"
| 25 || May 10 || @ Padres || 1–4 || Hawkins || Scurry (2–1) || — || 9,965 || 10–15
|- bgcolor="ccffcc"
| 26 || May 12 || Mets || 6–2 || Candelaria (3–3) || Torrez || — || 7,944 || 11–15
|- bgcolor="ccffcc"
| 27 || May 13 || Mets || 2–1 || Tekulve (1–1) || Diaz || — || 11,000 || 12–15
|- bgcolor="ffbbbb"
| 28 || May 14 || Mets || 2–6 || Allen || McWilliams (3–3) || Orosco || 8,931 || 12–16
|- bgcolor="ffbbbb"
| 29 || May 16 || Mets || 4–11 || Lynch || Bibby (1–4) || Swan || 1,970 || 12–17
|- bgcolor="ffbbbb"
| 30 || May 17 || Reds || 1–2 || Soto || Candelaria (3–4) || — || 5,207 || 12–18
|- bgcolor="ccffcc"
| 31 || May 18 || Reds || 2–1 || Rhoden (2–3) || Berenyi || — || 6,402 || 13–18
|- bgcolor="ccffcc"
| 32 || May 20 || Astros || 4–3 || McWilliams (4–3) || Knepper || Tekulve (1) || 13,643 || 14–18
|- bgcolor="ffbbbb"
| 33 || May 21 || Astros || 4–6 || LaCoss || Niemann (0–1) || DiPino || 8,804 || 14–19
|- bgcolor="ffbbbb"
| 34 || May 23 || @ Braves || 3–6 || Falcone || Rhoden (2–4) || Moore || 16,743 || 14–20
|- bgcolor="ccffcc"
| 35 || May 24 || @ Braves || 6–5 || McWilliams (5–3) || Camp || — || 17,447 || 15–20
|- bgcolor="ffbbbb"
| 36 || May 25 || @ Braves || 0–6 || McMurtry || Bibby (1–5) || — || 15,034 || 15–21
|- bgcolor="ccffcc"
| 37 || May 26 || @ Reds || 6–4 || Tunnell (1–1) || Puleo || Tekulve (2) || 10,018 || 16–21
|- bgcolor="ffbbbb"
| 38 || May 27 || @ Reds || 0–9 || Soto || Candelaria (3–5) || — || 13,224 || 16–22
|- bgcolor="ffbbbb"
| 39 || May 28 || @ Reds || 3–4 || Hayes || Scurry (2–2) || Scherrer || 23,994 || 16–23
|- bgcolor="ccffcc"
| 40 || May 29 || @ Reds || 8–5 || McWilliams (6–3) || Scherrer || Sarmiento (1) || 13,394 || 17–23
|- bgcolor="ccffcc"
| 41 || May 30 || Braves || 8–6 || Bibby (2–5) || McMurtry || Tekulve (3) || 12,211 || 18–23
|- bgcolor="ffbbbb"
| 42 || May 31 || Braves || 2–10 || Niekro || Tunnell (1–2) || Bedrosian || 5,262 || 18–24
|-

|- bgcolor="ffbbbb"
| 43 || June 1 || Braves || 3–6 || Perez || Candelaria (3–6) || Garber || 6,255 || 18–25
|- bgcolor="ffbbbb"
| 44 || June 2 || @ Cubs || 2–3 || Trout || Rhoden (2–5) || Smith || 6,589 || 18–26
|- bgcolor="ffbbbb"
| 45 || June 3 || @ Cubs || 3–9 || Ruthven || Scurry (2–3) || — || 6,213 || 18–27
|- bgcolor="ffbbbb"
| 46 || June 4 || @ Cubs || 2–5 || Jenkins || Bibby (2–6) || Campbell || 30,110 || 18–28
|- bgcolor="ffbbbb"
| 47 || June 5 || @ Cubs || 1–3 || Lefferts || Tunnell (1–3) || Smith || 22,649 || 18–29
|- bgcolor="ccffcc"
| 48 || June 7 || @ Expos || 3–2 || Candelaria (4–6) || Lea || Tekulve (4) || 31,730 || 19–29
|- bgcolor="ffbbbb"
| 49 || June 8 || @ Expos || 4–5 || Gullickson || Rhoden (2–6) || Reardon || 16,200 || 19–30
|- bgcolor="ccffcc"
| 50 || June 9 || @ Expos || 6–3 || McWilliams (7–3) || Rogers || — || 34,313 || 20–30
|- bgcolor="ccffcc"
| 51 || June 10 || @ Phillies || 4–3 (12) || Tekulve (2–1) || Farmer || — || 31,092 || 21–30
|- bgcolor="ffbbbb"
| 52 || June 11 || @ Phillies || 7–9 || Carlton || Scurry (2–4) || Holland || 34,820 || 21–31
|- bgcolor="ffbbbb"
| 53 || June 12 || @ Phillies || 4–5 (11) || Reed || Scurry (2–5) || — || 37,154 || 21–32
|- bgcolor="ccffcc"
| 54 || June 13 || Expos || 4–3 || Rhoden (3–6) || Gullickson || Tekulve (5) || 8,229 || 22–32
|- bgcolor="ffbbbb"
| 55 || June 14 || Expos || 3–7 || Rogers || McWilliams (7–4) || Reardon || 9,588 || 22–33
|- bgcolor="ffbbbb"
| 56 || June 15 || Expos || 4–7 || Burris || Bibby (2–7) || Reardon || 11,809 || 22–34
|- bgcolor="ccffcc"
| 57 || June 17 || Phillies || 2–1 || Candelaria (5–6) || Denny || Tekulve (6) || 19,814 || 23–34
|- bgcolor="ffbbbb"
| 58 || June 18 || Phillies || 4–6 || Bystrom || Rhoden (3–7) || — || 26,662 || 23–35
|- bgcolor="ffbbbb"
| 59 || June 19 || Phillies || 2–14 || Hudson || McWilliams (7–5) || — || 19,369 || 23–36
|- bgcolor="ccffcc"
| 60 || June 20 || Cubs || 5–4 (10) || Tekulve (3–1) || Campbell || — ||  || 24–36
|- bgcolor="ccffcc"
| 61 || June 20 || Cubs || 6–5 (13) || Robinson (1–0) || Campbell || — || 5,839 || 25–36
|- bgcolor="ccffcc"
| 62 || June 21 || Cubs || 8–4 || Rhoden (4–7) || Noles || — || 6,363 || 26–36
|- bgcolor="ccffcc"
| 63 || June 22 || Cubs || 5–2 || Candelaria (6–6) || Rainey || Guante (1) || 8,666 || 27–36
|- bgcolor="ccffcc"
| 64 || June 23 || Cubs || 5–2 || McWilliams (8–5) || Trout || — || 8,296 || 28–36
|- bgcolor="ccffcc"
| 65 || June 24 || @ Cardinals || 8–2 || Bibby (3–7) || LaPoint || Sarmiento (2) || 39,475 || 29–36
|- bgcolor="ccffcc"
| 66 || June 25 || @ Cardinals || 10–3 || Tunnell (2–3) || Hagen || — || 29,567 || 30–36
|- bgcolor="ccffcc"
| 67 || June 26 || @ Cardinals || 5–0 || Rhoden (5–7) || Allen || — || 32,306 || 31–36
|- bgcolor="ccffcc"
| 68 || June 27 || @ Cardinals || 6–1 || Guante (1–0) || Andujar || — || 23,286 || 32–36
|- bgcolor="ffbbbb"
| 69 || June 28 || @ Cubs || 7–8 (11) || Lefferts || Tekulve (3–2) || — || 11,832 || 32–37
|- bgcolor="ffbbbb"
| 70 || June 29 || @ Cubs || 0–5 || Ruthven || Bibby (3–8) || — || 28,504 || 32–38
|- bgcolor="ffbbbb"
| 71 || June 30 || @ Cubs || 3–4 || Smith || Sarmiento (1–2) || — || 17,261 || 32–39
|-

|- bgcolor="ffbbbb"
| 72 || July 1 || Cardinals || 6–13 || Andujar || Robinson (1–1) || — || 26,019 || 32–40
|- bgcolor="ccffcc"
| 73 || July 2 || Cardinals || 3–1 || Candelaria (7–6) || LaPoint || — || 27,446 || 33–40
|- bgcolor="ffbbbb"
| 74 || July 3 || Cardinals || 3–4 || Forsch || Sarmiento (1–3) || Sutter || 14,469 || 33–41
|- bgcolor="ccffcc"
| 75 || July 4 || Cardinals || 7–2 || Rhoden (6–7) || Hagen || — ||  || 34–41
|- bgcolor="ffbbbb"
| 76 || July 4 || Cardinals || 4–11 || Allen || Bibby (3–9) || — || 22,185 || 34–42
|- bgcolor="ccffcc"
| 77 || July 8 || @ Dodgers || 4–3 || Candelaria (8–6) || Reuss || Tekulve (7) || 41,397 || 35–42
|- bgcolor="ccffcc"
| 78 || July 9 || @ Dodgers || 3–0 || McWilliams (9–5) || Pena || — || 46,046 || 36–42
|- bgcolor="ffbbbb"
| 79 || July 10 || @ Dodgers || 3–10 || Hooton || Rhoden (6–8) || Howe || 42,480 || 36–43
|- bgcolor="ccffcc"
| 80 || July 11 || @ Giants || 3–2 || Sarmiento (2–3) || Breining || Scurry (3) || 18,429 || 37–43
|- bgcolor="ccffcc"
| 81 || July 12 || @ Giants || 6–2 || Tunnell (3–3) || Laskey || Guante (2) || 7,789 || 38–43
|- bgcolor="ccffcc"
| 82 || July 13 || @ Giants || 7–6 || Sarmiento (3–3) || Minton || Tekulve (8) || 14,316 || 39–43
|- bgcolor="ccffcc"
| 83 || July 14 || @ Padres || 8–6 || Guante (2–0) || Montefusco || Bibby (2) || 17,001 || 40–43
|- bgcolor="ccffcc"
| 84 || July 15 || @ Padres || 4–2 || Tekulve (4–2) || Thurmond || — || 15,601 || 41–43
|- bgcolor="ccffcc"
| 85 || July 16 || @ Padres || 3–2 || Robinson (2–1) || Whitson || Tekulve (9) || 26,414 || 42–43
|- bgcolor="ccffcc"
| 86 || July 17 || @ Padres || 4–3 || Tunnell (4–3) || Show || Tekulve (10) || 17,897 || 43–43
|- bgcolor="ccffcc"
| 87 || July 19 || Dodgers || 4–1 || Candelaria (9–6) || Reuss || Scurry (4) ||  || 44–43
|- bgcolor="ffbbbb"
| 88 || July 19 || Dodgers || 2–3 (11) || Howe || Sarmiento (3–4) || Niedenfuer || 31,304 || 44–44
|- bgcolor="ccffcc"
| 89 || July 20 || Dodgers || 7–3 || Rhoden (7–8) || Hooton || — || 16,561 || 45–44
|- bgcolor="ccffcc"
| 90 || July 21 || Dodgers || 5–4 || Tekulve (5–2) || Howe || — || 16,351 || 46–44
|- bgcolor="ffbbbb"
| 91 || July 22 || Giants || 3–5 || Barr || Scurry (2–6) || Minton || 23,834 || 46–45
|- bgcolor="ccffcc"
| 92 || July 23 || Giants || 5–2 || DeLeon (1–0) || Martin || Scurry (5) || 14,585 || 47–45
|- bgcolor="ccffcc"
| 93 || July 24 || Giants || 3–1 || Scurry (3–6) || Krukow || Tekulve (11) ||  || 48–45
|- bgcolor="ffbbbb"
| 94 || July 24 || Giants || 5–8 (11) || Minton || Scurry (3–7) || McGaffigan || 39,660 || 48–46
|- bgcolor="ccffcc"
| 95 || July 25 || Padres || 6–3 || Rhoden (8–8) || Dravecky || Guante (3) || 12,161 || 49–46
|- bgcolor="ffbbbb"
| 96 || July 26 || Padres || 1–6 || Thurmond || Robinson (2–2) || DeLeon ||  || 49–47
|- bgcolor="ccffcc"
| 97 || July 26 || Padres || 10–5 || Tunnell (5–3) || Whitson || — || 20,660 || 50–47
|- bgcolor="ccffcc"
| 98 || July 27 || Padres || 10–1 || DeLeon (2–0) || Show || — || 18,793 || 51–47
|- bgcolor="ccffcc"
| 99 || July 28 || @ Mets || 6–2 || McWilliams (10–5) || Swan || Scurry (6) || 12,233 || 52–47
|- bgcolor="ccffcc"
| 100 || July 29 || @ Mets || 2–1 || Candelaria (10–6) || Seaver || Guante (4) || 14,306 || 53–47
|- bgcolor="ccffcc"
| 101 || July 30 || @ Mets || 6–3 || Scurry (4–7) || Lynch || Sarmiento (3) || 17,721 || 54–47
|- bgcolor="ffbbbb"
| 102 || July 31 || @ Mets || 6–7 (12) || Orosco || Bibby (3–10) || — ||  || 54–48
|- bgcolor="ffbbbb"
| 103 || July 31 || @ Mets || 0–1 (12) || Orosco || Sarmiento (3–5) || — || 17,591 || 54–49
|-

|- bgcolor="ccffcc"
| 104 || August 2 || Phillies || 10–3 || McWilliams (11–5) || Gross || — || 25,130 || 55–49
|- bgcolor="ccffcc"
| 105 || August 3 || Phillies || 7–2 || Candelaria (11–6) || Bystrom || Tekulve (12) || 23,070 || 56–49
|- bgcolor="ffbbbb"
| 106 || August 4 || Phillies || 1–5 || Hudson || Rhoden (8–9) || Holland || 20,574 || 56–50
|- bgcolor="ffbbbb"
| 107 || August 5 || Expos || 1–7 || Gullickson || DeLeon (2–1) || — || 33,089 || 56–51
|- bgcolor="ffbbbb"
| 108 || August 6 || Expos || 3–7 || Smith || Tunnell (5–4) || — || 24,561 || 56–52
|- bgcolor="ffbbbb"
| 109 || August 7 || Expos || 0–6 || Rogers || McWilliams (11–6) || — || 29,187 || 56–53
|- bgcolor="ffbbbb"
| 110 || August 8 || @ Phillies || 5–14 || Hudson || Candelaria (11–7) || — || 38,080 || 56–54
|- bgcolor="ccffcc"
| 111 || August 9 || @ Phillies || 3–1 || Tekulve (6–2) || Holland || — || 37,719 || 57–54
|- bgcolor="ffbbbb"
| 112 || August 10 || @ Phillies || 2–4 || Carlton || DeLeon (2–2) || Holland || 38,705 || 57–55
|- bgcolor="ccffcc"
| 113 || August 12 || @ Expos || 6–3 || McWilliams (12–6) || Rogers || Guante (5) || 45,862 || 58–55
|- bgcolor="ccffcc"
| 114 || August 13 || @ Expos || 2–0 || Candelaria (12–7) || Smith || Tekulve (13) || 38,658 || 59–55
|- bgcolor="ccffcc"
| 115 || August 14 || @ Expos || 5–3 || Rhoden (9–9) || Schatzeder || Tekulve (14) || 50,062 || 60–55
|- bgcolor="ccffcc"
| 116 || August 15 || Mets || 4–2 || DeLeon (3–2) || Torrez || Tekulve (15) || 15,053 || 61–55
|- bgcolor="ccffcc"
| 117 || August 16 || Mets || 3–1 || Tunnell (6–4) || Swan || Guante (6) || 12,061 || 62–55
|- bgcolor="ffbbbb"
| 118 || August 18 || Reds || 5–6 || Hume || Tekulve (6–3) || Hayes || 18,007 || 62–56
|- bgcolor="ffbbbb"
| 119 || August 19 || Reds || 1–2 || Soto || Rhoden (9–10) || — || 15,995 || 62–57
|- bgcolor="ccffcc"
| 120 || August 20 || Reds || 4–0 || DeLeon (4–2) || Berenyi || — || 44,481 || 63–57
|- bgcolor="ffbbbb"
| 121 || August 21 || Reds || 4–6 || Scherrer || Guante (2–1) || — || 24,635 || 63–58
|- bgcolor="ffbbbb"
| 122 || August 23 || Astros || 5–6 || Ruhle || Tekulve (6–4) || DiPino ||  || 63–59
|- bgcolor="ffbbbb"
| 123 || August 23 || Astros || 1–2 || Niekro || Tunnell (6–5) || Dawley || 17,484 || 63–60
|- bgcolor="ffbbbb"
| 124 || August 24 || Astros || 4–10 || Madden || Rhoden (9–11) || LaCoss || 14,279 || 63–61
|- bgcolor="ccffcc"
| 125 || August 25 || Astros || 5–3 || DeLeon (5–2) || Knepper || Scurry (7) || 11,019 || 64–61
|- bgcolor="ccffcc"
| 126 || August 26 || Braves || 9–1 || McWilliams (13–6) || Perez || — || 23,772 || 65–61
|- bgcolor="ccffcc"
| 127 || August 27 || Braves || 2–0 || Tunnell (7–5) || Dayley || — || 22,811 || 66–61
|- bgcolor="ffbbbb"
| 128 || August 28 || Braves || 1–2 || Falcone || Candelaria (12–8) || Forster || 26,193 || 66–62
|- bgcolor="ccffcc"
| 129 || August 29 || @ Reds || 2–1 || Rhoden (10–11) || Soto || Tekulve (16) || 11,173 || 67–62
|- bgcolor="ccffcc"
| 130 || August 30 || @ Reds || 5–3 || DeLeon (6–2) || Russell || Tekulve (17) || 10,160 || 68–62
|- bgcolor="ffbbbb"
| 131 || August 31 || @ Astros || 1–4 || Niekro || Scurry (4–8) || — || 12,347 || 68–63
|-

|- bgcolor="ffbbbb"
| 132 || September 1 || @ Astros || 0–3 || Ryan || Guante (2–2) || DiPino || 7,645 || 68–64
|- bgcolor="ccffcc"
| 133 || September 2 || @ Braves || 4–1 || Candelaria (13–8) || Dayley || Tekulve (18) || 23,998 || 69–64
|- bgcolor="ccffcc"
| 134 || September 3 || @ Braves || 6–2 || Bibby (4–10) || Bedrosian || Guante (7) || 31,233 || 70–64
|- bgcolor="ffbbbb"
| 135 || September 4 || @ Braves || 5–6 || Forster || Bibby (4–11) || Bedrosian || 24,610 || 70–65
|- bgcolor="ffbbbb"
| 136 || September 5 || @ Cardinals || 4–7 || LaPoint || Scurry (4–9) || — ||  || 70–66
|- bgcolor="ffbbbb"
| 137 || September 5 || @ Cardinals || 6–7 (10) || Allen || Guante (2–3) || — || 39,687 || 70–67
|- bgcolor="ccffcc"
| 138 || September 6 || @ Cardinals || 5–0 || Tunnell (8–5) || Stuper || — || 23,604 || 71–67
|- bgcolor="ffbbbb"
| 139 || September 7 || @ Cardinals || 2–5 || Cox || Rhoden (10–12) || Sutter || 25,981 || 71–68
|- bgcolor="ffbbbb"
| 140 || September 9 || Phillies || 3–4 (13) || Hernandez || Bibby (4–12) || — || 24,304 || 71–69
|- bgcolor="ccffcc"
| 141 || September 10 || Phillies || 6–5 (10) || Tekulve (7–4) || Holland || — || 26,246 || 72–69
|- bgcolor="ffbbbb"
| 142 || September 11 || Phillies || 3–5 || Reed || Guante (2–4) || — || 19,130 || 72–70
|- bgcolor="ccffcc"
| 143 || September 12 || Cardinals || 7–5 || Tunnell (9–5) || Cox || Sarmiento (4) || 10,458 || 73–70
|- bgcolor="ccffcc"
| 144 || September 13 || Cardinals || 6–0 || Rhoden (11–12) || Andujar || — || 9,771 || 74–70
|- bgcolor="ccffcc"
| 145 || September 14 || Cubs || 6–3 || Candelaria (14–8) || Trout || — || 16,329 || 75–70
|- bgcolor="ccffcc"
| 146 || September 15 || Cubs || 8–4 || McWilliams (14–6) || Rainey || — || 7,943 || 76–70
|- bgcolor="ccffcc"
| 147 || September 16 || Expos || 9–0 || DeLeon (7–2) || Lea || — || 13,057 || 77–70
|- bgcolor="ccffcc"
| 148 || September 17 || Expos || 5–4 (13) || Bibby (5–12) || Dixon || — || 29,748 || 78–70
|- bgcolor="ffbbbb"
| 149 || September 18 || Expos || 2–5 || Sanderson || Rhoden (11–13) || James || 25,738 || 78–71
|- bgcolor="ffbbbb"
| 150 || September 19 || @ Mets || 4–5 (10) || Diaz || Tekulve (7–5) || — || 6,381 || 78–72
|- bgcolor="ccffcc"
| 151 || September 20 || @ Mets || 4–0 || McWilliams (15–6) || Lynch || — || 3,112 || 79–72
|- bgcolor="ffbbbb"
| 152 || September 21 || @ Cubs || 6–7 || Jenkins || Guante (2–5) || Smith || 3,029 || 79–73
|- bgcolor="ccffcc"
| 153 || September 22 || @ Cubs || 8–2 || Tunnell (10–5) || Reuschel || — || 3,426 || 80–73
|- bgcolor="ccffcc"
| 154 || September 23 || @ Expos || 10–1 || Rhoden (12–13) || Sanderson || — || 37,115 || 81–73
|- bgcolor="ccffcc"
| 155 || September 24 || @ Expos || 1–0 || Candelaria (15–8) || Smith || Guante (8) || 43,359 || 82–73
|- bgcolor="ffbbbb"
| 156 || September 25 || @ Expos || 3–5 || Gullickson || McWilliams (15–7) || Reardon || 37,602 || 82–74
|- bgcolor="ffbbbb"
| 157 || September 27 || Mets || 3–4 || Torrez || DeLeon (7–3) || Sisk || 10,913 || 82–75
|- bgcolor="ffbbbb"
| 158 || September 28 || Mets || 2–4 || Darling || Tunnell (10–6) || — || 8,672 || 82–76
|- bgcolor="ccffcc"
| 159 || September 29 || Mets || 4–2 || Rhoden (13–13) || Holman || Guante (9) || 7,677 || 83–76
|- bgcolor="ffbbbb"
| 160 || September 30 || @ Phillies || 1–2 || Denny || McWilliams (15–8) || Holland || 26,685 || 83–77
|-

|- bgcolor="ffbbbb"
| 161 || October 1 || @ Phillies || 3–5 || Altamirano || Guante (2–6) || Carman || 34,763 || 83–78
|- bgcolor="ccffcc"
| 162 || October 2 || @ Phillies || 4–0 || Tunnell (11–6) || Hudson || — || 33,284 || 84–78
|-

|-
| Legend:       = Win       = LossBold = Pirates team member

Roster

Opening Day lineup

Player stats
Batting
Note: G = Games played; AB = At bats; H = Hits; Avg. = Batting average; HR = Home runs; RBI = Runs batted in

Pitching
Note: G = Games pitched; IP = Innings pitched; W = Wins; L = Losses; ERA = Earned run average; SO = Strikeouts

Awards and honors 

1983 Major League Baseball All-Star Game
Bill Madlock, 3B, reserve

Transactions 
 October 4, 1982 – Released Grant Jackson.
 October 4, 1982 – Released Paul Moskau.
 October 20, 1982 – Bob Long granted free agency.
 November 10, 1982 – Omar Moreno granted free agency.
 December 1, 1982 – Signed Gene Tenace as a free agent.
 December 3, 1982 – Signed Jose Lind as an amateur free agent.
 December 6, 1982 – Odell Jones drafted by the Texas Rangers in the 1982 rule 5 draft.
 December 22, 1982 – Traded Jerry Aubin (minors), Bubba Holland (minors), Jose Rivera (minors) and Tim Burke to the New York Yankees. Received Lee Mazzilli.
 January, 1982 – Signed Randy Jones as a free agent.
 January, 1982 – Jim Smith sent to the Chicago White Sox in an unknown transaction.
 January 11, 1983 – Drafted Rich Sauveur in the 11th round of the 1983 amateur draft (January), but did not sign the player.
 January 11, 1983 – Drafted Tim Drummond in the 12th round of the 1983 amateur draft (January).
 January 28, 1983 – Signed Nino Espinosa as a free agent.
 March 8, 1983 – Signed Tom Hausman as a free agent.
 March 27, 1983 – Released Randy Jones.
 March 28, 1983 – Released Ross Baumgarten.
 March 28, 1983 – Released Dick Davis.
 March 28, 1983 – Released John Milner.
 May 2, 1983 – Signed Bob Owchinko as a free agent.
 June 6, 1983 – Drafted Stan Fansler in the 2nd round of the 1983 amateur draft.
 June 6, 1983 – Drafted Rich Sauveur in the 5th round of the 1983 amateur draft (June Secondary). Player signed June 8, 1983.
 June 6, 1983 – Drafted John Smiley in the 12th round of the 1983 amateur draft. Player signed June 10, 1983.
 June 6, 1983 – Drafted Steve Carter in the 21st round of the 1983 amateur draft, but did not sign the player.
 June 8, 1983 – Traded Steve Farr to the Cleveland Indians. Received John Malkin (minors).
 June 11, 1983 – Signed Félix Fermín as an amateur free agent.
 June 14, 1983 – Traded Arthur Ray (minors) and Junior Ortiz to the New York Mets. Received Steve Senteney and Marvell Wynne.
 August 2, 1983 – Purchased Dave Tomlin from the Montreal Expos.
 August 19, 1983 – Traded Steve Nicosia to the San Francisco Giants. Received Milt May and cash.
 August 29, 1983 – Signed Jose Melendez as an amateur free agent.
 September 1, 1983 – Purchased Alfonso Pulido from Mexico City Reds (Mexican).
 September 7, 1983 – Traded Randy Niemann to the Chicago White Sox. Received Mike Maitland (minors) and Miguel Diloné.

Farm system

Notes

References 
 1983 Pittsburgh Pirates at Baseball Reference
 1983 Pittsburgh Pirates at Baseball Almanac

Pittsburgh Pirates seasons
Pittsburgh Pirates season
Pitts